The T. Marzetti Company is the Specialty Food Group of the Lancaster Colony Corporation. T. Marzetti produces numerous salad dressings, fruit and vegetable dips, frozen baked goods and specialty brand items. It is the largest food and beverage company headquartered in Central Ohio. Headquartered in Westerville, Ohio, the T. Marzetti Company was founded by Teresa Marzetti.

History 
T. Marzetti started out as an Italian restaurant in Columbus, Ohio, started by the couple of Teresa and Joseph Marzetti, recent Italian immigrants, in 1896. Teresa's opening credo was:

"We will start a new place and serve good food. At a profit if we can, at a loss if we must, but we will serve good food."

Marzetti's became a local favorite especially among Ohio State University students, and grew to become a four star restaurant. Customers particularly enjoyed Teresa's Johnny Marzetti, a pasta dish named for her brother-in-law, as well as her homemade salad dressings. By 1955, Marzetti's upstairs kitchen of the restaurant became a full-scale factory, and the Marzetti brand of salad dressings found its way into grocery stores throughout Ohio. After Teresa Marzetti's death in 1972, the restaurant closed, but the company and factory have continued on to this day.

Products 
 Caviar
 Condiments
 Croutons and toppings
 Desserts and glazes
 Dips
 Dressings
 Egg noodles
 Frozen breads & rolls
 Light and reduced-calorie dressings
 Fresh bread

Brands
 Marzetti (Dressings and dips)
 New York Brand (Frozen Breads and croutons)
 Sister Schubert's (Frozen Breads)
 Amish Kitchens (Egg Noodles)
 Chatham Village (croutons)
 Cardini's (Dressings)
 Girard's (Dressings) (now licensed to a subsidiary of Haco AG, Bern, Switzerland)
 Inn Maid (Egg Noodles)
 Mamma Bella's (Frozen Breads)
 Marshall's (Frozen Biscuits)
 Pfeiffer (Dressings)
 Reames (Egg Noodles)
 Romanoff (Caviar)
 Jack Daniel's Mustard
 Flatout (Flatbreads and Flatbread products)
Bantam Bagels (Frozen Stuffed Bagel Holes)
Chick-fil-A Sauce

References

External links 

 T. Marzetti Company Web Site

Companies based in the Columbus, Ohio metropolitan area
Food and drink companies established in 1896
Food manufacturers of the United States
1896 establishments in Ohio
Food and drink companies established in 1986